The 1947 Toledo Rockets football team was an American football team that represented Toledo University (renamed the University of Toledo in 1967) in the Ohio Athletic Conference (OAC) during the 1947 college football season. In their second season under head coach Bill Orwig, the Rockets compiled a 9–2 record (3–1 against OAC opponents), outscored all opponents by a combined total of 255 to 115, and defeated New Hampshire, 20–14, in the 1947 Glass Bowl game. The 1947 season was the first nine-win season in program history, a feat that no Toledo team repeated until 1967.

Emerson Cole, who later played four years in the NFL, twice rushed for at least 200 yards in a game during the 1947 season. Cole also set a school record (later broken) with 31 rushing touchdowns in 1947. Lee Pete established a school record with a 65.2% pass completion percentage, a record that stood until 2001. Peete also established a school record (later broken) with an 86-yard touchdown pass to Dave Hamlar. Tony Wolodzko was the team captain. Tackles Ted Zuchowski and Frank Pizza were selected in the 1948 NFL Draft by the Pittsburgh Steelers and Detroit Lions, respectively.

Schedule

References

Toledo
Toledo Rockets football seasons
Toledo Rockets football